= Thierry Blu =

French researcher

Thierry Blu from The Chinese University of Hong Kong was named Fellow of the Institute of Electrical and Electronics Engineers (IEEE) in 2012 for fundamental contributions to approximation theory in signal and image processing.

== Biography ==
Born in Orléans, France in 1964, he graduated from the École polytechnique (Paris, France) in 1986 with a M.Sc. In 1988, he graduated (MEng) from École Nationale Supérieure des Télécommunications (Paris) from which he also obtained a PhD in electrical engineering (1996).
